The 2001–02 Magyar Kupa (English: Hungarian Cup) was the 62nd season of Hungary's annual knock-out cup football competition.

Quarter-finals
Games were played on March 5 and 6, 2002.

|}

Semi-finals
Games were played on April 2 and 3, 2002.

|}

Final

See also
 2001–02 Nemzeti Bajnokság I
 2001–02 Nemzeti Bajnokság II

References

External links
 Official site 
 soccerway.com

2001–02 in Hungarian football
2001–02 domestic association football cups
2001-02